David Burton Tyriver (October 31, 1937 – October 28, 1988) was an American professional baseball player, a right-handed pitcher who appeared in four Major League games for the Cleveland Indians during the 1962 season.

Tyriver's professional career lasted nine seasons (1956–64), all in the Cleveland organization. His four games all came in relief. In 10 innings pitched, he surrendered five earned runs, ten hits (including home runs by Steve Boros and Barry Shetrone) and seven bases on balls, with seven strikeouts. 

In minor league baseball, Tyriver won 78 games, and posted four seasons of ten or more victories. He died of a heart attack at age 50.

References

External links

1937 births
1988 deaths
Baseball players from Wisconsin
Burlington Indians players (1958–1964)
Cleveland Indians players
Daytona Beach Islanders players
Fargo-Moorhead Twins players
Jacksonville Suns players
Major League Baseball pitchers
Mobile Bears players
Portland Beavers players
Reading Indians players
Salt Lake City Bees players
Sportspeople from Oshkosh, Wisconsin